Bert D'Angelo/Superstar (shown as Bert D'Angelo in Britain) is an American police drama that aired on ABC on Saturday Nights from February 21 to July 10, 1976. The series was produced by Quinn Martin.

The series spun off from The Streets of San Francisco, although the episode which introduced the character ("Superstar") had its first airing on March 4, 1976, after the spinoff premiered. It was screened in Britain on BBC1 in the summer of 1976 (curiously, The Streets of San Francisco was an ITV import).

Premise
Bert D'Angelo was a ten-year veteran of the New York City Police Department transferred to San Francisco, "so as to acquaint the San Francisco Police Department with the way things were done back in New York City". He handled a variety of types of cases, including drugs, murders, and robberies.

Cast
 Paul Sorvino as Bert D'Angelo
 Robert Pine as Inspector Larry Johnson
 Dennis Patrick as Captain Jack Breen

Production 
The program was "filmed entirely on location in and around San Francisco". Martin was the executive producer. Directors were Harry Falk, Virgil W. Vogel, Michael Caffey, David Friedkin, and William Hale. Writers were Larry Alexander, D. C. Fontanta, and Marion Hargrove.

Critical reception
Critic John Camper of the Chicago Daily News found little positive about the program as he wrote, "YOU try to think of something interesting to say about it." He noted about D'Angelo, "With practically no evidence he intuits the entire convoluted murder plot by the end of Act iV".

Dwight Newton, writing in the San Francisco Examiner, compared Bert D'Angelo to the film Dirty Harry (1971), dubbing D'Angelo "Dirty Bert" because the TV character bent rules like the film character did. Newton described the show as "similar slop" to the film and called the program a "garbage-heap clinker". He praised Sorvino for his performance: "Sorvino imbues his cop role with vitality, finesse, humaneness and, when called upon, great roaring fervor".

Episodes

References

External links 
 

1976 American television series debuts
1976 American television series endings
American Broadcasting Company original programming
1970s American crime television series
Television shows set in San Francisco
Television series by CBS Studios